Gurnee Munn (April 30, 1887 - May 7, 1960) was a businessman, president of the American Totalisator Company and former member of the New York Stock Exchange. He served in World War I and World War II.

Biography
Munn married Marie Louise Wanamaker of Philadelphia on June 28, 1915. The couple remained married until Marie Louise filed for divorce in 1933. The basis for the divorce was cruelty.

Munn was the father of two children, Fernanda and Gurnee, Jr. Fernanda later married Lt. Francis L. Kellogg of the US Army. Gurnee Munn, Jr. first married Adrianna Manfredi, daughter of the Marchese and Marchesa Manfredi of Italy. That marriage ended in divorce in 1942. He later married Margaret Keohane of New York City in 1945.

Munn, a Washington, DC businessman, acquired the seat of Robert Johnson, Jr., on the New York Stock Exchange for $468,000 in June 1930. Mr. Munn was employed by W.R.K. Taylor & Co. at the time. Munn later sold his seat on the exchange to Francis Norris in November 1931.

After World War I, Munn founded the Palm Beach real estate firm of Munn, Hull & Boardman. After he left W.R.K. Taylor & Co. in 1931, he joined the American Totalalisator Co. as vice president and treasurer, a position he held until his death. He also served as president of the company from 1950 to 1955.

Munn died in his home in Palm Beach, Florida on May 7, 1960. He was 73 years of age.

Memberships
He was a member of the Everglades Club of Palm Beach, the Brook Club of New York, the Racquet and Tennis Club of New York, the Bucks Club of London and the Travelers Club of Paris.

References

1887 births
1960 deaths
American manufacturing businesspeople
Harvard University alumni